Safwat is a given name. Notable people with the name include:

Safwat El-Sherif former Egyptian politician, former speaker of the Egyptian Shura Council
Safwat Ghayur (1959–2010), senior two-star police officer in the Khyber Pakhtunkhwa Province of Pakistan
Safwat Hegazi (born 1963), Egyptian imam and television preacher, banned from the UK for stirring-up hatred
Safwat al-Din Khatun (died 1295), known as Padishah Khatun, ruler of Kirman in Persia from 1291 until 1295
Jehan Safwat Raouf (born 1933), widow of Anwar Sadat, First Lady of Egypt from 1970 to 1981
Ahmed Safwat, former Egyptian professional squash player
Mahmoud Safwat (born 1929), intelligence officer and Olympic gymnast
Mohamed Safwat (born 1990), Egyptian tennis player

See also
Safwat al-safa, a hagiography of the Sufi shaykh Safi-ad-din Ardabili (1252–1334), founder of the Safaviya Sufi order
SFWA (disambiguation)
Safat
Swat (disambiguation)